Sir James Steel, 1st Baronet (1830–1904) was a Scottish builder and businessman who served  as Lord Provost of Edinburgh from 1900 to 1903.

He was the largest building firm in Edinburgh in his day. His rise to fame and fortune is described as a textbook "rags to riches" story.

Life

He was born on 13 March 1830 the son of James Steel of Summerside Mains in Cambusnethan.

In 1866 he began a building firm in Edinburgh, linked to a stone quarry business which he already owned. He was then living at 11 Lothian Road. His building work is characterised by an enormous flair, and his elegant terraces in the West End were clearly aimed at the more affluent sections of the Edinburgh population. These include: Eglinton Crescent, Coates Gardens, Buckingham Terrace (west), Glencairn Crescent, Belgrave Place and the west end of Belgrave Crescent. In these proposals Steel replaced the original architect John Chesser (who he originally worked with) with his own architect Alexander Macnaughtan and was threatened with legal action for variance from the plan. This resulted in the final section of Buckingham Terrace being built omitted (later built on as a church).

He entered Edinburgh Town Council in 1872 and served as a magistrate for many years.

In 1878 he bought several acres of land west of Dean Bridge from the bankrupt Alexander Learmonth who had inherited the land from his successful father John Learmonth.

In 1894 he bought a 33-acre site between Queensferry Road and Comely Bank and developed this as dense (but attractively laid out) four storey tenements. The area is now the Comely Bank/Learmonth estate. Its centrepiece is the dramatic switchback street, Comely Bank Avenue.

In 1900 he succeeded Sir Mitchell Mitchell Thomson as Lord Provost. He was succeeded in turn in 1903 by Sir Robert Cranston. He was created a Baronet by King Edward VII in 1903 during his first visit to Scotland.

He died at 32 Colinton Road in Edinburgh on 3 December 1904. He is buried in Dean Cemetery in the west of the city. The grave lies in the first northern extension attaching the main cemetery, just north-east of the huge obelisk to Alexander Russell.

The large red granite obelisk to Steel includes a fine bronze bust by the sculptor John Stevenson Rhind, erected in 1906. The monument previously held bronze dogs lying on the shoulders of the monument. These were stolen in the 1980s.

Family

Lady Steel is listed as still living at 32 Colinton Rd in 1910.

He is not the grandfather to Sir William Steel Lord Provost from 1938 to 1941.

Other Positions of Note

Chairman of the Niddrie and Benhar Coal Company
Chairman of the Broxburn Oil Company
Member of the Iron and Steel Institute

References

1830 births
1904 deaths
Lord Provosts of Edinburgh
Baronets in the Baronetage of the United Kingdom
Burials at the Dean Cemetery
19th-century Scottish businesspeople